WZZX (780 AM) was a radio station licensed to serve Lineville, Alabama. The station was owned by Williams Communications Inc.  It last aired an urban music format, simulcasting sister station WFXO.

History
The station was assigned the WZZX call letters by the Federal Communications Commission in 1983, replacing the earlier WANL designation in use from 1967 to 1983.
WZZX's license was cancelled at the licensee's request by letter dated August 1, 2016, although the FCC did not receive the letter until September 26, 2017 (and, therefore, the cancellation did not occur until then).

References

External links
FCC Station Search Details: DWZZX (Facility ID: 56745)
FCC History Cards for WZZX (covering 1966-1980 as WANL)

ZZX
Defunct radio stations in the United States
Radio stations established in 1967
1967 establishments in Alabama
Radio stations disestablished in 2017
2017 disestablishments in Alabama
ZZX
ZZX